Standing Up for Sunny is a 2019 Australian film comedy written and directed by Steven Vidler, and starring RJ Mitte, Sam Reid and Matt Nable.

Synopsis
An isolated man with cerebral palsy is railroaded into helping an unassertive comedienne, and finds love and acceptance through stand-up comedy.

Cast
 RJ Mitte as Travis
 Sam Reid as Mikey
 Matt Nable as Male Interviewer
 Barry Humphries as himself
 Ella Scott Lynch as Felicity
 Philippa Northeast as Sunny

Production
Filming took place in Sydney, New South Wales, Australia in 2018.

Release
The film premiered at the Sydney Film Festival in June 2019.

It was also shown at CinefestOZ to a packed audience in September 2019.

The general release date was 5 December 2019.

Reception
Standing Up for Sunny received favourable reviews from Australian critics.

Andrew F. Peirce of The Curb said, "It’s so rare to see a film that shines this brightly, and it’s so rare to see one that gives people with disabilities the chance to be funny".

Matthew Eeles of Cinema Australia called the film, "Tender, clever and very, very funny".

Julian Wood at Filmink said, "The film is certainly amiable, and the low budget gives it a sense of immediacy and authenticity".

Isobel Sanby at Newsworthy gave the film four stars and stated, "What Standing Up for Sunny communicates is that it is not just representation on screen that needs to be addressed, it is accessibility holistically".

References

External links
 Standing Up For Sunny at Madman Entertainment
 

2019 films
Australian comedy-drama films
Films set in New South Wales
Films set in the 21st century
2010s English-language films